Kach is town and union council of the Ziarat District in the Balochistan province of Pakistan. It is located at 30°26'2N 67°19'27E and has an altitude of 2020m (6630ft).

References

Populated places in Ziarat District
Union councils of Balochistan, Pakistan